Yla may refer to:

Places
 Ylä-Enonvesi, Finland
 Ylä-Malmi, Finland
 Ylä-Rieveli, Finland

Other
 YLA, part of Model Congress
 Yaul language (by ISO 639 code)